is a Japanese former hammer thrower who competed in the 1960 Summer Olympics, in the 1964 Summer Olympics, in the 1968 Summer Olympics, and in the 1972 Summer Olympics.

References

1938 births
Living people
Japanese male hammer throwers
Olympic male hammer throwers
Olympic athletes of Japan
Athletes (track and field) at the 1960 Summer Olympics
Athletes (track and field) at the 1964 Summer Olympics
Athletes (track and field) at the 1968 Summer Olympics
Athletes (track and field) at the 1972 Summer Olympics
Asian Games gold medalists for Japan
Asian Games silver medalists for Japan
Asian Games gold medalists in athletics (track and field)
Asian Games medalists in athletics (track and field)
Athletes (track and field) at the 1962 Asian Games
Athletes (track and field) at the 1966 Asian Games
Medalists at the 1962 Asian Games
Medalists at the 1966 Asian Games
Japan Championships in Athletics winners
20th-century Japanese people